Graham Albert William Reed (born 6 February 1938) is an English former professional footballer who played as a wing half for Sunderland.

References

1938 births
Sportspeople from King's Lynn
English footballers
Association football wing halves
King's Lynn F.C. players
Sunderland A.F.C. players
Wisbech Town F.C. players
English Football League players
Living people